Will Kelly (born 16 August 2000) is an Australian rules footballer who plays for the Collingwood Football Club in the Australian Football League (AFL). Son of Craig Kelly, who played for Collingwood in the VFL/AFL, he played for the Oakleigh Chargers in the TAC Cup before he was drafted with pick 29 in 2018 under the father–son rule.

Junior and state football
Kelly played junior football for the Glen Iris Gladiators in the Yarra Junior Football League, making over 100 appearances for them. He played at his school, Scotch College, mostly as a forward. Kelly also played under-18s football for the Oakleigh Chargers in the TAC Cup, before getting selected by Collingwood. In 2017, he played only one game for Oakleigh Chargers. The next year he found his niche and helped lead the Oakleigh Chargers to the Grand Final, which they lost to the Dandenong Stingrays by four points. He played his last four games of the season with a stress fracture in his ankle. His performance also led to him representing Vic Metro in the 2018 AFL Under 18 Championships, playing all four games. During the 2019 AFL season, his first season on Collingwood's books, Kelly made four appearances with the club's Victorian Football League (VFL) side.

AFL career
Kelly was drafted by Collingwood with the 29th draft pick in the 2018 AFL draft, under the father–son rule, with Collingwood matching Adelaide's bid. Like team-mates Josh Daicos and Callum Brown, Kelly decided not to wear his father's guernsey number, picking a new number. Kelly debuted for Collingwood in Round 6 of the 2020 AFL season, in the club's 32-point victory over Hawthorn. collecting five disposals and kicking a goal. Unfortunately he dislocated his elbow, and missed the rest of the season.

Playing style
Kelly is an athletic tall defender who can play one-on-one and negate his opponent. He has modelled his game on Collingwood team-mate, Jeremy Howe.

Personal life
Kelly is the son of former Collingwood premiership player Craig Kelly. His brother, Jake, played football in the Australian Football League after Collingwood passed on drafting him.

Statistics
Updated to the end of the 2022 season.

|-
| 2019 ||  || 27
| 0 || — || — || — || — || — || — || — || — || — || — || — || — || — || —
|- 
| 2020 ||  || 27
| 1 || 1 || 1 || 4 || 1 || 5 || 2 || 0 || 1.0 || 1.0 || 4.0 || 1.0 || 5.0 || 2.0 || 0.0
|-
| 2021 ||  || 20
| 2 || 0 || 0 || 6 || 5 || 11 || 4 || 0 || 0.0 || 0.0 || 3.0 || 2.5 || 5.5 || 2.0 || 0.0
|-
| 2022 ||  || 20
| 0 || — || — || — || — || — || — || — || — || — || — || — || — || — || —
|- class=sortbottom
! colspan=3 | Career
! 3 !! 1 !! 1 !! 10 !! 6 !! 16 !! 6 !! 0 !! 0.3 !! 0.3 !! 3.3 !! 2.0 !! 5.3 !! 2.0 !! 0.0
|}

Notes

References

External links

2000 births
Living people
Australian rules footballers from Melbourne